Ashton F. Embry (born August 13, 1946) is a Canadian research scientist at the Geological Survey of Canada.

Embry is a graduate of the University of Manitoba, who received a PhD in stratigraphy from the University of Calgary in 1976.  He first did field work in the Arctic Islands of Canada in 1969 and has studied the geology of this area ever since, establishing stratigraphy, sedimentology and petroleum geology of the Mesozoic succession of the Sverdrup Basin Magmatic Province. The fossil sarcopterygian fish Laccognathus embryi of the Devonian was named in his honour.

Published works

 On line=7 April 2003

Notes

Canadian geologists
Canadian paleontologists
Geological Survey of Canada personnel
Living people
1946 births
University of Manitoba alumni
University of Calgary alumni